David Bruce Gallik (born March 12, 1954) was a Democratic Party member of the Montana House of Representatives, representing District 79 from 2000 to 2008.

External links
Representative Dave Gallik official website
Montana House of Representatives - Dave Gallik official MT State Legislature website
Project Vote Smart - Representative David B. 'Dave' Gallik (MT) profile
Follow the Money - Dave Gallik
2006 2004 2002 2000 campaign contributions

Democratic Party members of the Montana House of Representatives
1954 births
Living people